Pavle Ivić (1 December 1924 – 19 September 1999) was a Serbian South Slavic dialectologist and phonologist.

Biography
Both his field work and his synthesizing studies were extensive and authoritative. A few of his best-known publications are:
 Die serbokroatischen Dialekte, ihre Struktur und Entwicklung, Gravenhage, Mouton, 1958
 Srpski narod i njegov jezik (The Serbian People and Their Language). Belgrade, 1971;
 Word and sentence prosody in Serbocroatian, by Ilse Lehiste and Pavle Ivić. Cambridge, Mass.: MIT Press, 1986.

He edited many periodicals and scholarly series, and was an important figure in the All-Slavic Linguistic Atlas project. He was an authority on the standardization of the Serbian language. He frequently lectured in the U.S. and other countries, and was an Honorary Member of the Linguistic Society of America.

A member of the Serbian Academy of Sciences and Arts, he took part in the polemics accompanying the breakdown of 1945-1991 Yugoslavia. He was as signatory of the 1986 Memorandum of the Serbian Academy of Sciences and Arts.

He was married to Milka Ivić (1923-2011), a Slavic syntactician and professor.

External links
'History of Serb Culture' Online Book

1924 births
1999 deaths
Writers from Belgrade
Linguists from Serbia
Serbian scientists
Slavists
Phonologists
Eastern Orthodox Christians from Serbia
Members of the Serbian Academy of Sciences and Arts
20th-century linguists